Vehicle engineering can refer to:
Aerospace engineering
Automotive engineering
Naval engineering